Majdan (Serbian Cyrillic: Мајдан) is a mountain in southern Serbia, near the town of Medveđa. Its highest peak Vratnica Jokovića has an elevation of 1096 meters above sea level.

References

Mountains of Serbia